Antidote is a 2021 science fiction horror film written and directed by Peter Daskaloff along with Matthew Toronto.

Plot 

A woman, Sharyn Berkley, is taken to the hospital by her husband. Sharyn is informed that she has acute appendicitis and will need emergency surgery. After awakening from the surgery, Sharyn is greeted by Dr. Aaron Hellenbach. Sharyn finds that the surgical incision on her lower abdomen is almost fully healed. Sharyn questions Dr. Hellenbach about this and is told that the facility has unconventional healing methods. Sharyn flees from her room and meets Rizzo briefly before being sedated by staff.

Locked in her room, Sharyn begins communicating with her neighbor Everett via notes passed through a hole in the wall. Sharyn witnesses a man with bleeding eyes being led through the hallway outside and hears Everett being attacked in his room. Sharyn is visited by Dr. Hellenbach, who asks Sharyn whether she has any regrets. Sharyn lies and says she does not. Sharyn begs to go home, but Dr. Hellenbach says that she is not ready. Sharyn is introduced to several other patients, including Cassandra Franklin; Rizzo; Marjorie, whose eyelids are paralyzed; Lester, who is criminally insane; and Everett, a criminal attorney. Everett reveals that his tongue was cut out but grew back. Cassandra tells Sharyn that they are in an experimental facility and that she had been burned alive.

Rizzo is selected for an experimental procedure during the "Indexing" and reveals to Sharyn that he had been impaled. Sharyn observes Dr. Hellenbach administering a healing serum to Rizzo and asks why this was done to him. Dr. Hellenbach ominously tells Sharyn that "he did this to himself."

Dr. Hellenbach finds Sharyn wandering around the halls and takes her to his office. In exchange for a phone call to her family, Sharyn agrees to tell Dr. Hellenbach about her ex-boyfriend, Nico, a drug trafficker who committed suicide. Sharyn attempts to make a phone call but finds that the phone does not work. Sharyn begins wandering the halls again and finds a room containing a piano and a noose. As punishment for not following the rules, Sharyn's left leg is amputated and then subsequently reattached. Rizzo comes to visit Sharyn and tells her that he thinks the military is harvesting test subjects in order to develop immortal soldiers. Sharyn tries to escape for a third time but is likewise unsuccessful.

Everett tells Sharyn that if they cooperate, they will be released from the facility in three months. However, after Sharyn reveals to Everett that she saw Nico in the facility, ten years after he supposedly committed suicide, Everett confronts Dr. Hellenbach about his release date. Dr. Hellenbach assures Everett that his file will be reviewed in three months. Sharyn asks Cassandra about her time at the facility, but Cassandra says that she does not know how long she has been there.

Sharyn and Cassandra conspire to escape the facility. Sharyn manages to steal Dr. Hellenbach's keys from his pocket while pretending to lose her balance. Sharyn and Cassandra scour Dr. Hellenbach's office and find a map of the facility. They manage to avoid being caught by Dr. Hellenbach in the medication room, but several nursing staff recognize them and corner them in the hallway. Cassandra attempts to kill herself by cutting her neck, which grants Sharyn time to continue escaping. Sharyn forms an alliance with Rizzo after he protects her from one of Lester's attacks. However, while the duo hide in an empty room during the Indexing, Rizzo gropes and kisses Sharyn. In retaliation, Sharyn rips off Rizzo's testicles before continuing her escape.

Sharyn manages to reach the exit door and escape outside. An alarm immediately goes off as staff members chase after her. Sharyn finds her way to a residential home, but is followed by a staff member and eventually brought back to the facility. Upon awakening, Sharyn finds that she is being hanged in the piano room and dropped to the floor before dying. Sharyn asks Dr. Hellenbach why he keeps healing her instead of killing her, and is told that they do not kill people here. Dr. Hellenbach asks Sharyn about her regrets again. Sharyn denies having any regrets other than being a drug addict, and Dr. Hellenbach tells her that she is not a good liar.

Sharyn confronts Everett and asks him how he came to the facility. Everett explains that he had been in a bad car accident resulting in broken ribs and neck injuries. Sharyn asks him whether he has ever done anything terrible and explains that she thinks that is the reason they are at the facility.

Sharyn finds Cassandra alive in her room. Cassandra says that they want to keep burning her alive and that she deserves it. Cassandra explains that a few weeks ago, she broke into a mink farm. After releasing the minks, she burned the farm to the ground, but inadvertently killed the farmers that were still sleeping in the house. Cassandra says that the only way out of here is death, to which Sharyn tells her that they are already dead. Sharyn hypothesizes that they are in Hell. Sharyn reveals that ten years ago, she accidentally killed her boyfriend and then framed the murder as a suicide. Sharyn confronts Dr. Hellenbach and finds him reading Dante's Inferno, in which sinners are cyclically tortured and healed. Dr. Hellenbach reveals that everyone in the facility is a patient, including him, and that he had caused overdoses in his patients by overprescribing opiates. After three months in Hell, each patient is evaluated and then given the opportunity to begin torturing others.

Nico appears and drags Sharyn out of Dr. Hellenbach's room. Sharyn tells Nico that she regrets murdering him and begs him to let her rot. Nico refuses to do this. They are confronted by Dr. Hellenbach while leaving the room, but Nico overpowers him and the duo walk away. After traversing the halls, they find themselves at the edge of a cliff, with lava down below. Sharyn bids Nico goodbye and attempts to walk off the edge. A path across the lava begins to form as doctors attempt to resuscitate Sharyn's body on Earth. Sharyn makes it to the other edge, but Nico is unable to follow.

Sharyn awakes in her hospital bed and is informed that she had been placed into a medically induced coma due to complications from the surgery. Sharyn is told that she was clinically dead for about 15 seconds. Sharyn raises her hospital gown and finds a large bandage over her lower abdomen. Sharyn's husband and daughter enter the hospital room and greet her.

Once home, Sharyn looks online and finds an article on The New American Journal of Medicine's website related to Dr. Hellenbach. The article, written in April 1969, confirms Dr. Hellenbach's story that he had died in 1969. Sharyn also finds articles related to Cassandra Franklin, who died following a mushroom poisoning.

Cast

Production 
Antidote was filmed in Los Angeles, California.

Reception 
Rotten Tomatoes reports that 60% of critics gave the film a positive review with an average score of 5.3/10, based on 5 reviews.

Enrique Acosta, writing for Film Threat, said, "Antidote is a credible effort. I would love to see what Mr. Daskaloff might create with a decent budget. If you get a chance, I recommend you check this one out."

References

External links 

 
 

2021 science fiction films
American science fiction films
2020s American films